Big Brother is a 1923 American silent drama film directed by Allan Dwan and written by Rex Beach and Paul Sloane. The film stars Tom Moore, Edith Roberts, Raymond Hatton, Joe King, Mickey Bennett, Charles Henderson, and Paul Panzer. The film was released on December 23, 1923, by Paramount Pictures.

Big Brother was shot at the Astoria Studios with extensive location shooting around New York City. Noted at the time for its realism, it is now considered a lost film. It was remade as a sound film in 1931 as Young Donovan's Kid.

Plot
As described in a film magazine review, Jimmy Donovan, gang leader in the East Side of New York City, protects Midge Murray when the latter's brother is slain. Jim decides that he must reform and bring up Midge decently. However, a court takes possession of Midge away from him. Jim, disgusted, plans a raid but then abandons the idea. His gang commits a robbery, and Jim and his girlfriend Kitty are accused of it. Jim escapes, recovers the loot and custody of Midge, and wins back the affection of Kitty.

Cast

Preservation
With no prints of Big Brother located in any film archives, it is a lost film.

References

Bibliography
 Lombardi, Frederic (2013). Allan Dwan and the Rise and Decline of the Hollywood Studios. McFarland & Company .

External links

Lantern slide and window card

1923 films
1920s English-language films
Silent American drama films
1923 drama films
Paramount Pictures films
Films directed by Allan Dwan
American black-and-white films
Lost American films
American silent feature films
Films based on works by Rex Beach
Films shot at Astoria Studios
1923 lost films
Lost drama films
1920s American films